Rang Rasiya (English title: Colours of passion) is an Indian erotic drama film based on the life of the 19th-century Indian painter Raja Ravi Varma. Made as a bilingual, the film is titled Rang Rasiya in its Hindi version and Colours of Passion in English. The film, directed by Ketan Mehta, is produced by his wife Deepa Sahi and by Aanand Mahendroo. It stars Randeep Hooda as the title character and Nandana Sen as his love interest.

Script and fictionalization
Mehta thought that Varma was the most fascinating artist of that era and his character, persona and paintings. He was fascinated with Ravi Varma right from his days at Film and Television Institute of India. After reading Desai's novel, Mehta felt inspired to make a film based on the life and times of Ravi Varma, and set about formulating the story of his new film. He moulded and recast the script to project Ravi Varma as a radical painter, a strident advocate of the artistic license to depict nudity, and as a victim of conservative society.  Given that many of Ravi Varma's paintings are actually used as icons of worship in Hindu homes, this positioning represents a major stretch of the imagination, a major effort at fictionalization. In fact, Ravi Varma was himself of conservative outlook whose paintings indicate that he had a strong preference for decently clad, soft-featured, ladylike gentlewomen and a distaste for brazen hussies. Very few of his works venture into the realms of semi-nudity, and these few forays seem to have been calculated, highly reluctant efforts on his part to appeal to a western audience. Even at that time, art appreciation in the west was in the grip of a progressivist mafia who cherished radicalism and disdained traditional norms. In the present era, Ketan Mehta dealt with a similar environment in India, and this informed the choices he made while developing the script of this film. Also, a simple, lineal depiction of Ravi Varma's life and career would have given the film the look and feel of a documentary, which is what had happened with his previous film, Sardar. Movies require a narrative, as also a certain amount of drama and sensuality, and the script was developed to meet these needs. Mehta came across a relatively minor (and frivolous) court case which had been brought against Ravi Varma for allegedly depicting a Hindu deity irreverent in one of his paintings, and used this to develop a suitable script.

Production 
After his last commercial production Mangal Pandey: The Rising (2005), Mehta chose to make a film on the 19th-century painter, Raja Ravi Varma's life. Incidentally both these movies were based on a subject from the 19th century. Rang Rasiya is an adaptation of the biographical novel Raja Ravi Varma authored by the Marathi writer Ranjit Desai.

Cast and crew

When Mehta first met Nandana Sen at her house, he saw two life-size reproductions of Raja Ravi Varma's paintings. This indicated to him that she was familiar with the artist and his works, something that he thought would make his job as a director easier. Speaking of the character she was to portray, he said:
"To me, she was the perfect woman to play the muse of an artist who sparked off debates about censorship of art. She has that child-woman quality, which was so much a part of Sugandha's personality."
The much desired controversy regarding "censorship of art" was quickly forthcoming, and Nandana was the willing lynchpin of that achievement. Among several scenes in the film that depict her in various grades of undress, one wide angle shot shows the bare breasts of a skimpily clad Nandana. The Central Board of Film Certification, which regulates the ratings and certification of media in India, duly objected to the scene, terming it nudity.

Mehta saw Hooda's previous films Risk and D. In this film, he played the role of Raja Ravi Varma in two phases — first as a 60-year-old and then as a 20-year-old in a span of 10 days. As a preparation for his role, Hooda tried to learn the basics of painting. He was happy working in the film and said that his acting skills were well-groomed by Mehta's abilities.

Paresh Rawal plays an important role in the film. Triptha Parashar, whom Mehta spotted in an advertisement, was immediately offered the role of a princess without auditioning. Feryna Wazheir, who was born and raised in the UK to Kashmiri parents, plays a Parsi girl in the film.

Sangita Kathiwada is the creative consultant and Niharika Khan, the award-winning designer is the costume designer.

Cast
 Randeep Hooda as Raja Ravi Varma
 Nandana Sen as Sugandha
 Gaurav Dwivedi as Raj Varma
 Vipin Sharma as Paachan
 Paresh Rawal as Seth Govardhan Das
 Jim Boeven as Fritz Schleicher
 Feryna Wazheir as Frenny
 Rashaana Shah as Kaamini
 Darshan Jariwala as Chintamani Maharaj
 Suhasini Mulay as Sugandha's mother Bakubai
 Sachin Khedekar as Dewanji Madhavrao
 Triptha Parashar as Poorutarthy
 Vikram Gokhale as Keshav Shastri
 Sri Vallabh Vyas as Sugandha's father Hirachand
 Tom Alter as Justice Richards
 Ashish Vidyarthi as Raja Thiurmal
 Rajat Kapoor as Auctioneer
 Shamim Ahmed Shaikh as Old Man Praying

Soundtrack
The soundtrack of Rang Rasiya is composed by Sandesh Shandilya and lyrics are written by Manoj Muntashir

Track listing

Release 
The film was screened at 2008 The Times BFI London Film Festival.

Rang Rasiya had been languishing in post-production from the year 2008 due to the Censor Board's objection with certain bold scenes that involved paint and nudity. It has been given a release date of 7 November 2014.

See also
 Ananthabhadram
 Makaramanju

References

External links 
 
 

Indian multilingual films
2000s Hindi-language films
Indian erotic drama films
Indian biographical drama films
2008 films
Films directed by Ketan Mehta
2000s erotic drama films
Biographical films about painters
2000s English-language films